Sophora tonkinensis is a herb used in traditional Chinese medicine.

Sofalcone is an oral gastrointestinal medication and a synthetic derivative of sophoradin, an isoprenyl chalcone found in S. tonkinensis.

References

External links

tonkinensis